Mordellistena fuscodoralis is a beetle in the genus Mordellistena of the family Mordellidae. It was described in 1936 by Ray.

References

fuscodoralis
Beetles described in 1936